The 2012 Star Xing Pai Haikou World Open was a professional ranking snooker tournament that took place between 27 February – 4 March 2012 at the Haikou Stadium in Haikou, China. It was the first time that the tournament was held outside the United Kingdom. It was televised on ITV4

Marco Fu made the 86th official maximum break during his round 4 qualifying match against Matthew Selt. This was Fu's second 147 break.

Neil Robertson was the defending champion, but lost 2–5 against Stephen Lee in the second round.

Mark Allen won his first ranking title by defeating Stephen Lee 10–1 in the final.

Prize fund
The breakdown of prize money for this year is shown below: 

Winner: £75,000
Runner-up: £34,000
Semi-final: £16,000
Quarter-final: £10,000
Last 16: £7,500
Last 32: £6,000
Last 48: £2,300
Last 64: £1,500

Stage one highest break: £500
Stage two highest break: £2,000
Stage one maximum break: £500
Total: £400,500

Wildcard round
These matches were played in Haikou on 27 February 2012.

Main draw

Final

Qualifying
These matches were held between 11 and 14 January 2012 at the World Snooker Academy, Sheffield, England.

Century breaks

Qualifying stage centuries 
 

 147  Marco Fu
 138  Marcus Campbell
 137  Mark Davis
 136  Yu Delu
 135, 125  Anthony Hamilton
 132  Kurt Maflin
 123, 103  Alfie Burden
 122  Robert Milkins
 121, 104  David Gilbert
 120  Joe Jogia
 119, 118  Tian Pengfei
 118  Liam Highfield

 117  Andrew Norman
 116  Andrew Higginson
 116  Michael Holt
 113  Sam Baird
 110, 103  Michael White
 107  Adrian Gunnell
 106  Sam Craigie
 104, 100  Jimmy Robertson
 104  Liang Wenbo
 103  Fergal O'Brien
 100  Ken Doherty

Televised stage centuries 
 
 138, 120, 109  Stephen Lee
 136, 133  John Higgins
 136, 106  Neil Robertson
 135, 101, 101  Michael Holt
 131, 115  Shaun Murphy
 127, 123, 112, 105, 104, 104, 103, 101, 100, 100, 100  Mark Allen
 117, 112, 109, 108, 105, 102  Mark Selby
 117, 106, 102  Robert Milkins
 111, 104  Judd Trump
 100  Tom Ford

References

External links

2012
World Open
World Open (snooker)
Snooker competitions in China
Haikou